Salmen High School is a public high school in Slidell, Louisiana, United States, under the St. Tammany Parish School Board.

The school serves southern Slidell and Eden Isle.

History
Hurricane Katrina devastated Salmen, pushing a storm surge of over eight feet through the area. All the buildings were devastated, with the exception of the new science wing, which was part of the original building.  After the storm, the school was closed for just over a month, but on 3 October 2005, Salmen started a platooning schedule at Northshore High School, which was mostly untouched by the storm. Northshore students attended from 6:55 a.m. to 12:35 p.m., and Salmen attended from 1:25 p.m. to 6:55 p.m. In mid January, the Federal Emergency Management Agency's assessment showed that more than 51% of the Salmen campus was damaged beyond repair, meaning that everything except the science building would have to be demolished and rebuilt.  The new school was completed in the summer of 2010 and in August, the staff moved into the new building permanently. On 17 January 2006, Salmen moved into the rebuilt St. Tammany Jr. High School, and is intended to finish the year there.  A temporary school is being built for the 2006–2007 and 2007–2008 school years. Before the storm, Salmen had just over 1000 students. As of 21 February 2006 about 800 of them have returned.

The new school was completed in 2010 and is elevated 15 ft to feature tuck-under parking.

Sources: The New Orleans Times Picayune

Athletics
Salmen High athletics competes in the LHSAA.

Championships
Football championships
(3) State Championships: 1994, 1995, 2000

Football, girls' basketball and baseball teams won state championships in 1996, bringing a total of three state championships to Salmen High School for the 1995–96 academic year.

Notable alumni
Kalani Brown - Los Angeles Sparks center and former Baylor National Champion (2019 Women's Champion)
Chris Duhon -  Los Angeles Lakers point guard and Duke graduate
Mike Fontenot- former Baltimore Orioles top pick and Chicago Cubs second baseman
Mike Sutton (American football) - former LSU defensive lineman and NFL player

See also
Northshore High School
Fontainebleau High School
List of high schools in Louisiana

References

External links
Salmen High School's official website
The St. Tammany Parish School Board official website

Public high schools in Louisiana
Schools in St. Tammany Parish, Louisiana
Slidell, Louisiana